Celebrity MasterChef is a Romanian competitive cooking game show. It is spin-off of MasterChef România, itself an adaptation of the British show MasterChef, and features celebrity contestants. It began production in early 8 October 2013, and was broadcast on PRO TV on 22 October 2013.

Format
In contrast to its parent show, the celebrity version is based around a heats and semi-finals format similar to MasterChef Goes Large, and is aired only once a week in a two-hour format.

Celebrities are split into groups of three as they compete in a heat round featuring two challenges, with one celebrity making their way from each heat into the semi-finals. The heats consist of an Invention Test, in which they prepare a dish of their own concoction, and a Pressure Test, in which they must complete a dish from a professional chef. Due to the difficulty of these dishes contestants are given a single "lifeline" in which the chef is able to aid them for 90 seconds.

The six remaining celebrities will then face further challenges in order to secure their place in the final.

Cast
The series is judged by Florin Dumitrescu, Cătălin Scărlătescu and Sorin Bontea.

Contestants

TV ratings

The show's premier received 8.3 share, which jumped to 17.8 in its second week.

References

Romanian reality television series
Romania
Pro TV original programming
2013 Romanian television series debuts
2013 Romanian television series endings
2010s Romanian television series
Masterchef
Romanian television series based on British television series